Khargushki (also Romanized as Khargūshkī; also known as Khargūshgī) is a village in Sorkh Qaleh Rural District, in the Central District of Qaleh Ganj County, Kerman Province, Iran. At the 2006 census, its population was 76, in 23 families.

References 

Populated places in Qaleh Ganj County